Victor Geoffrion (October 23, 1851 – May 31, 1923) was a Canadian politician.

Born in St-Simon de Bagot, Quebec, the brother of Félix Geoffrion and Christophe-Alphonse Geoffrion, both MPs, Geoffrion was educated at the St. Hyacinthe Seminary and McGill University. A lawyer, he was a partner in the law firm of Geoffrion, Geoffrion, & Cusson in Montreal. He was first elected to the House of Commons of Canada for the electoral district of Chambly—Verchères in a 1900 by-election and was re-elected in 1900, 1904, and 1908. A Liberal, he was defeated in 1911. He died in his law office.

References
 
 The Canadian Parliament; biographical sketches and photo-engravures of the senators and members of the House of Commons of Canada. Being the tenth Parliament, elected November 3, 1904

1851 births
1923 deaths
Liberal Party of Canada MPs
McGill University alumni
Members of the House of Commons of Canada from Quebec
Lawyers in Quebec